Mansfield High School (MHS) is a four-year, comprehensive public high school located in Mansfield, Massachusetts, United States. It is the lone high school in the Mansfield Public Schools system. MHS serves approximately 1,300 students in grades nine though twelve. The school teams are named the Hornets, the mascot is Sting the Hornet, and the school colors are green, white, and black.

Academics

Faculty 
Mansfield High School (2018-2019) employs 299 teachers with 83 teaching within the eight core academic departments. This leads to an overall student to teacher ratio of 13.23 to 1, which is in line with the 13 to 1 statewide student to teacher ratio.

Graduation requirements
For the current graduating class, the Class of 2022, students are required to complete and pass courses totaling 124 credits. Twenty-five of those must be passed during the students’ senior year. In addition to credit requirements, students must also pass the state-required MCAS exam. There are also departmental requirements for graduation, listed below. 

English – Students must take and pass four English courses usually consisting of English 9, English 10, English 11, and English 12. However, in place of English 11 and English 12, students may opt to take AP Language and Composition and AP Literature and Composition to obtain college credit.

Mathematics – Students must take and pass three Mathematics courses in order to graduate, although many students take four courses. Most students usually take Algebra I, Geometry, Algebra II, and Advanced Algebra or Pre-Calculus. However, students may opt to take AP Calculus AB, AP Calculus BC, AP Computer Science Principles, or AP Statistics to obtain college credit.

Social studies – Students must take and pass three Social Studies courses in order to graduate. Students usually take World History, American History I, and American History II to meet this requirement. However, many students take AP American History, AP European History, or AP Psychology to obtain college credit.

Science – Students must take and pass three science courses during their tenure at Mansfield High School in order to graduate. Many students take Biology, Chemistry, and Physics to meet this requirement. Also, students may opt to take AP Physics, AP Chemistry, AP Biology, or AP Environmental Science to obtain college credit.

Health and physical education – Students must take and pass two heath classes and two physical education classes to meet the graduation requirements. This usually consists of Introduction to Wellness freshman year, the student's choice of a gym class sophomore year, Health Dynamics junior year, and the student's choice of a gym class senior year.

Courses
Mansfield High School offers a wide variety of courses, in addition to the “core” classes. MHS has a set of Advanced Placement courses that allow students to begin their college education while still receiving high school credit. Below is a list of the Advanced Placement, and most notable courses.

Levels
Advanced Placement – Offers students the ability to earn college credit. These courses are more difficult and require more dedication than the average high school course. Advanced Placement (AP) courses culminate with an exam administered by the College Board which determines how much credit the student receives.

Honors – These courses contain challenging material designed for the motivated student. They are more difficult that the standard College Preparatory classes.

College preparatory – These courses prepare students for traditional college level education.

Comprehensive – These courses are designed to prepare students for junior (two-year) college or work after high school.

Advanced Placement
Mansfield High School offers Advanced Placement courses in Music Theory, English Language and Composition, English Literature and Composition, Calculus AB, Calculus BC, Computer Science Principles, Statistics, Biology, Chemistry, Physics C, Environmental Science, American History, European History, Psychology, Spanish Language and Composition, French Language and Composition, and Art History. Each student can take at most nine Advanced Placement courses during their stay at MHS; one as a sophomore, up to three as a junior, and up to four as a senior or five with special permission from the principal.

Grading
Students at Mansfield High School are graded on a 0-100 scale, where an A is 90-100, a B is 80-89, a C is 70-79, a D is 65-69, and anything below a 65 is considered failing. Students are awarded credit for each successful passing of a course, however if a student is absent from the course too many times, credits may be deducted.

Class rank
Class rank has been removed starting with the Class of 2023. The graduating Class of 2022 was the last class to receive class rank and top ten recognition. There is no way of knowing who would give a valedictorian and salutatorian speech without class rank, and the school has yet to specify what they plan to do.

Performing arts
Below are the three areas in which Mansfield High School specializes for students to enroll in the Performing Arts.

Choir - The choir puts on several concerts per year, including the Holiday Concert and Spring Concert, and also directs and produces the school's fall play and spring musical. There are three different choirs, the Concert Choir, the After School Choir, and the Select Choir.

Orchestra - The orchestra, run by Gail Colombo performs several times per year, including the Holiday Concert. They have won various awards at local MICCA competitions.

Band - The Band Program includes Marching Band, Jazz Band, and a Concert Band. This is not to be confused with the extracurricular band programs, which includes a World Champion Percussion Ensemble (WGI, PSCO), and a competitive Winter Colorguard (2010 NESBA Champions). The Marching Band performs at many school events, including the MIAA Super Bowl, supporting the MHS Football team.  The Percussion Ensemble and Winter Colorguard compete in the New England Scholastic Band Association and Winter Guard International.
 
Percussion Ensemble - The Mansfield High School Percussion Ensemble has competed at WGI World Championships in 2007 (PSCO Gold Medalists), 2008 (PSCO Gold Medalists; received the highest score in indoor percussion history, 98.9, which was then outscored in 2012), 2009 (PSCW Silver Medalists) 2012 (PSCO Silver Medalists, PSA Finalist), 2013 (PSCO Bronze Medalists) 2014 (PSCO Silver Medalists) and 2015 (PSCO Gold Medalists). The group also holds NESBA Championships in PSCO 2007, 2008, 2009, 2012 and 2013, and NESBA Championships in PSAA in 2010, 2011, and 2012.

Athletics
Below is a list of the athletic programs offered at Mansfield, and the seasons when they are held. 
Fall – Cheerleading, Cross Country, Field Hockey, Football, Golf, Soccer, and Volleyball.
Winter – Basketball, Cheerleading, Gymnastics, Ice Hockey, Indoor Track, Swimming, and Wrestling
Spring – Baseball, Softball, Lacrosse, Tennis, and Track and Field.

Mansfield High School offers 25 different varsity level sports. All sports have junior varsity and varsity levels and the heavily participated sports have a freshman level as well. Mansfield sports teams are known as the Hornets and the school colors are Green, White and Black. In recent years, the athletic complexes around Mansfield have been revamped. Mansfield had an artificial turf football field installed behind the high school along with a rubber track in 2001 and dubbed Alumni Field. A new baseball complex was constructed in 2005, located across the street, in front of the Jordan Jackson Elementary school. Mansfield competes in the Hockomock League .

Football
The Hornets won the Hockomock League Championship six years in a row from 2003 – 2008, and won it four years in a row from 2010 - 2013. The 2013 Mansfield football season was an especially successful season, as they began the season by defeating national power and three-time defending Maryland state champions, Dunbar High School of Baltimore, MD in a televised game. Mansfield defeated Dunbar in a last second 29-26 upset win. The Hornets then ran the table throughout the season, eventually finishing the season undefeated at 13-0, winning their 7th state championship in the process, and finished the season as the #1 ranked team in Massachusetts and the New England region.

Football accomplishments
State champions (8) - 1992, 1994, 1996, 2003, 2004, 2010, 2013, 2019
Hockomock League champions (20) - 1959, 1968, 1976, 1989, 1992, 1994, 1996, 2001, 2003, 2004, 2005, 2006, 2007, 2008, 2010, 2012, 2013, 2018, 2019, 2020
 #1 ranked team in Massachusetts (4) - 1996, 2003, 2004, 2013
 Undefeated seasons (9) - 1931, 1936, 1959, 1992, 1996, 2003, 2004, 2013, 2020

Track & field
The indoor track team has won 3 straight Indoor Track State Championships, along with 11 straight Hockomock League Championships in the same sport.

Basketball
In the 2012 - 2013 season, the boys' basketball team finished with an undefeated regular season and made it all the way to the Division 1 State Championship, and lost. They finished the season being the #1 ranked boys' basketball team in Massachusetts.

Notable alumni

 Tom Gilson, American football player (UMass) (Arena: Portland Steel)
 Jen Royle, American former reporter/journalist for YES Network and current private chef

References

Mansfield High School. " High School Staff." March 12, 2019.
Mansfield High School. "Mansfield High School." March 12, 2019.
Mansfield High School. "Principals." March 12, 2019.
Mansfield High School. "Student Handbook." March 12, 2019.
Mansfield High School, Guidance Department.      "Graduation Requirements." March 12, 2019.
Massachusetts Department of Education. "Massachusetts Teacher Data" March 13, 2019.
Mansfield High School, 2019-2020 Program of Studies.   "2019-2020 Program of Studies." March 4, 2019.
Mansfield Band Parents, Percussion Ensemble. "MHS Percussion Ensemble." March 13, 2019.
Mansfield Band Parents, Marching Band. "MHS Marching Band." March 13, 2019.
Mansfield Football. "Mansfield Football." March 13, 2019.
Mansfield Indoor Track Results. "Indoor Track Results. " March 13, 2019.
Mansfield High School Athletics "Mansfield High School Athletics. " March 15, 2019. 
Maxpreps, 2013 Massachusetts Boys State Basketball Playoff Brackets "Division 1 Brackets" March 15, 2019

External links
Mansfield High School
Mansfield Band Parents

Mansfield, Massachusetts
Educational institutions established in 1872
Schools in Bristol County, Massachusetts
Public high schools in Massachusetts
1872 establishments in Massachusetts
Hockomock League